Cova da Beira may refer to:

Places

Portugal
 Cova da Beira Subregion, NUTS 3 region of Portugal
 Cova da Beira IPR, wine region in Portugal